Roy Clifford Chapman (18 March 1934 – 21 March 1983) was an English professional football player and manager. He was the father of former Arsenal and Leeds United striker Lee Chapman.

An inside-forward, he started his career at Aston Villa in 1952, before he moved on to Lincoln City five years later to find first team football. In 1961 he was sold to Mansfield Town, where he remained for the next four years, before he returned to Lincoln as the club's player-manager in 1965. He gave up his management duties the following year, before moving on to Port Vale in 1967. In all he scored 200 goals in 415 games in the Football League.

In 1969, he joined Stafford Rangers via Chester. He was also given the management job at Rangers, and held this position until 1975, at which point he was made manager of Stockport County. His reign at Stockport was brief, and he became a coach before returning to Stafford for a second spell as manager in 1977, before he left for a second time in 1980. As Stafford manager he led the club to a Northern Premier League, FA Trophy, and Staffordshire Senior Cup treble in 1972; as well as another Staffs Cup victory in 1973 and another FA Trophy success in 1979.

Playing career
Chapman began his professional playing career with Aston Villa in February 1952, having initially joined the club from Kynocks Works as an amateur three months earlier. He made 19 appearances for the "Villans" in the First Division. He spent 1955 to 1957 in the Royal Air Force. Finding his first team opportunities limited at Villa Park, manager Eric Houghton allowed him to leave for Bill Anderson's Lincoln City in November 1957. The "Imps" narrowly avoided relegation out of the Second Division in 1957–58, finishing one place and one point above relegated Notts County. He finished as the club's top scorer in 1958–59 with 15 goals, as Lincoln avoided relegation despite achieving a lower points tally than in the previous campaign. They rose up the table to 13th in 1959–60, but were relegated in last place in 1960–61, despite Chapman becoming top-scorer again with 16 goals. He then departed Sincil Bank on a £7,000 move to Mansfield Town.

The "Stags" finished 14th in the Fourth Division in 1961–62 under Raich Carter's stewardship, before Chapman and strike partner Ken Wagstaff fired the club to promotion in 1962–63. Mansfield took to life in the Third Division well under new boss Tommy Cummings, and posted a seventh-place finish in 1963–64, before missing out on promotion in 1964–65 due to their inferior goal average.

Chapman left Field Mill and returned to Lincoln as player-manager in March 1965, who were by now seeking re-election to the Fourth Division. In August 1965 he came on as a substitute, replacing Bunny Larkin; this was the first substitution in the club's history. Lincoln finished 22nd in 1965–66, and once again had to apply for re-election. In October 1966 he reverted to solely a playing capacity as Ron Gray was appointed as manager. He scored 21 goals in 1966–67 to become the club's top-scorer, but despite his scoring efforts the "Imps" still finished bottom of the Football League.

In June 1967, he joined Port Vale in a playing capacity, on a wage of £35 a week. He was ever-present in the 1967–68 season, finishing as the club's top scorer with 25 goals in 49 games; he was also the division's joint top-scorer, along with Halifax Town's Les Massie. In the summer manager Stanley Matthews resigned, and Gordon Lee took charge at Vale Park. Despite suffering from sciatica, Chapman scored 12 goals in 34 games in the next season to once again become the top marksman.

His final playing club in the Football League was Ken Roberts's Chester, who he joined in May 1969. He struck five goals in four pre-season friendly matches, and then followed it up with two goals on his league debut at Scunthorpe United to take his career tally to 200. However just one more league goal followed in his next eight league games and Chapman moved on to Southern League Premier Division side Nuneaton Borough for a fee of £1,500, as part of manager Dudley Kernick's £10,000 spending spree. He scored 27 minutes into his first game for the club, a friendly with a Crystal Palace XI. He left Nuneaton at the end of the 1969–70 season to join  Stafford Rangers as player-manager.

Style of play
A two footed player, he was aggressive and had ball control skills, but lacked pace.

Managerial career
Chapman steered Stafford Rangers to a treble of the FA Trophy, Northern Premier League and Staffordshire Senior Cup in 1972. Rangers topped the league with 71 points, and beat Barnet 3–0 at Wembley in the Trophy final. This was followed up by him leading Rangers to the FA Cup fourth round three years later. He then returned to professional circles with a short spell as Stockport County manager, where he signed George Best on a short-term deal. His reign at Stockport was short and he returned to Port Vale as a coach in August 1976, before being sacked in May 1977 and returning to Stafford.

In his second spell in charge of Rangers he led them to another FA Trophy triumph (this time a 2–0 victory over Kettering Town) before standing down in 1980.

Later life and death
After leaving Rangers he took up the position as manager of Walsall Sports Company.

He died in Stoke-on-Trent, three days after his 49th birthday. He had suffered a fatal heart attack, when playing in a five-a-side tournament.

Career statistics

Playing statistics
Source:

A.  The "Other" column constitutes appearances and goals in the League Cup, Football League Trophy, Football League play-offs, Full Members Cup, Southern League Cup, Birmingham Senior Cup,  Midland Floodlit Cup, President's Cup and  Camkin Cup.

Managerial statistics
Source:

Honours

As a player
Mansfield Town
Football League Fourth Division fourth-place promotion: 1962–63

As a manager
Stafford Rangers
Northern Premier League: 1971–72
FA Trophy: 1972, 1979
Staffordshire Senior Cup: 1972, 1973

References

1934 births
1983 deaths
Footballers from Birmingham, West Midlands
English footballers
Association football forwards
Aston Villa F.C. players
Lincoln City F.C. players
Mansfield Town F.C. players
Port Vale F.C. players
Chester City F.C. players
Nuneaton Borough F.C. players
Stafford Rangers F.C. players
English Football League players
Northern Premier League players
Association football player-managers
English football managers
Lincoln City F.C. managers
Stafford Rangers F.C. managers
Stockport County F.C. managers
English Football League managers
Northern Premier League managers
Association football coaches
Port Vale F.C. non-playing staff